Kathleen Radtke (born 31 January 1985) is a German footballer who plays as a defender for MSV Duisburg.

Early life
Radtke studied sports psychology at the Friedrich-Schiller-University Jena until her move to Sweden in the spring of 2013.

Club career
Radtke began her career in 1990 with VfB Gröbzig. She then played for the youth teams of CFC Germania Köthen and Hallescher FC where she has named 2001 Sportswoman of the Year. During the 2002/2003 season, she played for the youth academy of 1. FFC Turbine Potsdam and then joined the youth club, CFC Germania Köthen, in 2004. During the 2005/2006 season, she returned to professional football and signed with FC Lok Leipzig. In the summer of 2009, Radtke joined FF USV Jena in the Frauen Bundesliga. On 7 February 2013 she announced her move to the FC Rosengård (formerly LdB FC Malmö) in the Swedish Damallsvenskan, her first experience of full-time professional football.

Having become one of the first three Germans to win the Swedish women's league title, on 3 July 2014 Radtke moved to England to join WSL newcomers Manchester City.

Honours

Club
1. FFC Turbine Potsdam
Bundesliga: 2004
DFB-Pokal: 2004

FC Rosengård
Damallsvenskan: 2013

Manchester City
Women's League Cup: 2014

References

External links

 
 Profile at soccerdonna.de 
 Profile at worldfootball.net 
 

1985 births
Living people
German women's footballers
1. FFC Turbine Potsdam players
MSV Duisburg (women) players
FF USV Jena players
FC Rosengård players
Damallsvenskan players
German expatriate sportspeople in Sweden
Expatriate women's footballers in Sweden
Manchester City W.F.C. players
Women's Super League players
Expatriate women's footballers in England
German expatriate sportspeople in England
German expatriate women's footballers
Frauen-Bundesliga players
Women's association football midfielders
Women's association football defenders